Communication with submarines
 Submarine communication cables